Francesca Bortolotto Possati is an Italian entrepreneur, author, interior designer, philanthropist and hotelier.

She is the chief executive officer of the Bauer Hotel group in Venice, and the granddaughter of Arnaldo Bennati, a Ligurian shipbuilder who purchased the Bauer Hotel in 1930.

She was the only female CEO in the city of Venice as of 2008. A native of Venice, she has also been involved in the city's cultural life over many years.

Early life
Bortolotto Possati was raised in Venice, and moved to the United States in 1982 with her then-husband, Marco Possati. During her time in the U.S., she lived in Texas, Michigan, and New York, and she earned two degrees in English.

Business life 
Following her studies, she settled in New York for a time, where she became an independent consultant for interior designers and decorators.

Upon her return to Venice in the late 1990s, she started a real estate agency, but soon after took control of the family estates at the Bauer Hotel.

Public life 
As well as a hotelier, Bortolotto Possati is a public figure and a patron of the arts, with a particular focus on Venice. She is on the board of Save Venice Inc., a foundation dedicated to restoring important works of architecture and art in Venice.

She sponsors the Zuecca Project Space (a non-profit area on the Giudecca island that hosts art exhibitions and events in conjunction with local and international art communities).

Bortolotto Possati presents the Ca' Foscari Award at Venice's international literary festival.

She has published a recipe book, Celebrate in Venice, co-authored by Csaba dalla Zorza.

Bortolotto Possati serves on the board of Altagamma, which recognizes Italian companies that have achieved international renown.

Personal life 
Bortolotto Possati divorced from her husband, Marco Possati, in 1993; she remains unmarried. She has two children, Alessandro and Olimpia.

See also

 List of Italians
 Lists of writers

References 

Year of birth missing (living people)
Place of birth missing (living people)
20th-century births
20th-century Italian non-fiction writers
20th-century Italian women writers
21st-century Italian writers
21st-century Italian women writers
Chief executives in the hospitality industry
Italian cookbook writers
Hotel executives
Italian chief executives
Italian expatriates in the United States
Italian food writers
Italian hoteliers
Italian interior designers
Italian philanthropists
Living people
Patrons of literature
Businesspeople from Venice
Real estate brokers
Italian women company founders
Women corporate directors
Women hoteliers
Women cookbook writers